Noah Tiberius Paravicini  (born April 10, 1997) is a retired American professional soccer player who last played for Charlotte Independence in the USL Championship.

Career

Youth, college and amateur
Paravicini played youth soccer with Marin FC 97 Blue, where he won a NorCal State Cup, five NorCal Premier League championships and made the finals of two Surf Cups. In 2015, Paravicini went to play college soccer at Dartmouth College, where he made 67 appearances over 4 seasons with the Big Green. During his time at Dartmouth, Paravicini scored 8 goals, tallied 8 assists and was named Second Team All-Ivy in both 2016 and 2017.

Whilst at Dartmouth, Paravicini also played for NPSL side Sonoma County Sol in 2015 and 2016, and for USL PDL side Seacoast United Phantoms in 2017.

Following college, Paravicini spent time with USL League Two side Ventura County Fusion in 2019, but didn't appear for the team. Later in the year Paravicini played in the NPSL Founders Cup in 2019 with Napa Valley 1839.

Professional
On December 18, 2019, it was announced Paravicini had signed with USL Championship side Hartford Athletic ahead of their 2020 season. He sustained a season-ending injury and did not appear for the team.

On April 16, 2021, Paravicini joined USL Championship side Charlotte Independence following a trial with the club. He made his professional debut on May 1, 2021, appearing as a 62nd–minute substitute during a 3–0 loss to Tampa Bay Rowdies.

Personal
Paravicini's father was born in Argentina but grew up in Venezuela. Paravicini also holds a Swiss passport.

References

1997 births
Living people
American soccer players
Association football midfielders
Dartmouth Big Green men's soccer players
Sonoma County Sol players
Seacoast United Phantoms players
Ventura County Fusion players
Hartford Athletic players
Charlotte Independence players
Soccer players from California
National Premier Soccer League players
USL League Two players
USL Championship players
People from Petaluma, California